Talaud is an Austronesian language spoken on the Talaud Islands north of Sulawesi, Indonesia.

Phonology

Consonants 

  can be heard as a palatal stop , depending on the dialect.
 The velar fricative sound  may also be pronounced as voiceless .

Vowels

References

Further reading

 
 
 

North Sulawesi
Languages of Sulawesi
Sangiric languages